Reddy Ice Holdings, Inc. is the largest packaged ice manufacturer in the United States, serving approximately 82,000 customer locations under the Reddy Ice brand name.

It was originally a division of the Southland Corporation (the parent company of 7-Eleven), who sold it off to what would become Suiza Foods in 1988. It was sold to private investors in 2000 and went public in 2005.

The company declared Chapter 11 bankruptcy on April 5, 2012, in Dallas citing $434 million in assets against $531 million liabilities.  According to a prepackaged bankruptcy plan backed by Centerbridge Partners the company would merge Arctic Glacier which is also in bankruptcy with Centerbridge forgiving the debt in exchange for an ownership position in the new company.

On January 16, 2013, their CEO Gilbert Cassagne resigned, the position was taken over by Bill Corbin, who was named board chairman in November, and is now executive chairman and interim CEO.

References

7-Eleven
Manufacturing companies based in Dallas